Ernesto Agazzi (born 4 September 1942) is a Uruguayan agronomist and politician, belonging to the Broad Front.

He served as Minister of Livestock, Agriculture, and Fisheries and he was also a member of the Senate of Uruguay.

References 

Uruguayan agronomists
Broad Front (Uruguay) politicians
Ministers of Livestock, Agriculture, and Fisheries of Uruguay
Members of the Senate of Uruguay
1942 births
Living people
Place of birth missing (living people)